Sleepy Creek is an unincorporated community in Morgan County, West Virginia on the Potomac River at the mouth of Sleepy Creek. By 1860, Sleepy Creek had a post office and functioned as an important station on the Baltimore and Ohio Railroad.

Sleepy Creek is located along River Road (Morgan County Route 1) east of Hancock and is accessible from Cherry Run to its east by way of Householder Road (County Route 10).

The community was named after nearby Sleepy Creek.

References 

Unincorporated communities in Morgan County, West Virginia
Unincorporated communities in West Virginia
Baltimore and Ohio Railroad
West Virginia populated places on the Potomac River